The 2002 Junior Pan American Rhythmic Gymnastics Championships was held in Santo Domingo, Dominican Republic, November 4–10, 2002.

Medal summary

References

2002 in gymnastics
Pan American Gymnastics Championships
International gymnastics competitions hosted by the Dominican Republic